Malick Hassan Sanogo (born June 30, 2004) is an American soccer player who plays as a forward for German club Union Berlin U19.

Early life
Sanogo was born in New York City, United States, and is the son of former Ivory Coast international soccer player Boubacar Sanogo. He moved to Germany at the age of one, and played for Energie Cottbus before moving to Union Berlin in 2019, when his father was appointed coach of the under-17 side.

Club career
Following his move to Union Berlin, Sanogo enjoyed a stellar 2019–20 season, scoring 16 goals and notching 7 assists in 21 games. This form reportedly caught the attention of English Premier League sides Chelsea and Tottenham Hotspur.

Having already trained with the first team, and playing in a friendly against Eintracht Braunschweig in March 2021, he signed his first professional contract in August of the same year.

In October 2021, he was included in The Guardian's "Next Generation" list for 2021 - highlighting the best young players in the world.

International career
Sanogo is eligible for the United States, Germany and Ivory Coast. He was called up to the Germany under-16 in August 2019, and then the Germany under-17 side in 2020, but the under-17 game he was set to feature in was cancelled.

In November 2021, Sanogo was called up to the United States under-20 side, playing in three games.

References

External links
 

2004 births
Living people
Soccer players from New York City
American people of Ivorian descent
American soccer players
United States men's under-20 international soccer players
Ivorian footballers
German footballers
Association football forwards
FC Energie Cottbus players
1. FC Union Berlin players